Indian Old Fields was an unincorporated community located in Clark County, Kentucky, United States.

The community takes its name from the Indian old field present when white settlers arrived. They discovered the Native American settlement of Eskippakaithiki, believed to be the last Indian village in Kentucky. It was also named Indian Old Corn Field. It was established by Peter Chartier, the leader of a band of Shawnee, sometime in 1745.

Further reading

References

Unincorporated communities in Kentucky
Native American history of Kentucky
Former Native American populated places in the United States
History of Kentucky
Former populated places in Kentucky
1745 establishments in the Thirteen Colonies